The Ambassador of Malaysia to the United Mexican States is the head of Malaysia's diplomatic mission to Mexico. The position has the rank and status of an Ambassador Extraordinary and Plenipotentiary and is based in the Embassy of Malaysia, Mexico City.

List of heads of mission

Ambassadors to Mexico

See also
 Malaysia–Mexico relations

References 

 
Mexico
Malaysia